Snowcake was a Scottish band formed in Edinburgh, Scotland in 1983 by guitarist-singer Axel Fischer (AKA Alex) and bassist Ag Holstrom (AKA Agstrom), which was notable for its influence on US alternative rock bands of the late 1980s and early 1990s. Unusually for a band of their significance, they hardly produced any recorded output and their influence was solely due to their live performance.

With a shared love of US hardcore, the 1970s NY punk scene and early US alternative rock, Fischer and Holstrom wrote songs prolifically using firstly a number of temporary drummers and then an early drum machine, the band gigged heavily on the then buoyant UK university circuit with support slots on early tours from US visitors R.E.M. and Hüsker Dü.

Frustrated with an early success that brought them a solid but limited UK fan base, the two looked to the US for their future and relocated to Minneapolis, ostensibly to holiday, but with a plan to be closer to the burgeoning hardcore/alt-rock scene. Hooking up with drummer Mark Mitschell (AKA Zoom) from Cleveland, the band gigged constantly throughout the north US for the next two years and developed a fearsome live act, and although Fischer's heavily distorted guitar was the default sound of the day on the hardcore circuit, the strength of the duo's songwriting combined with Fischer's sweet voice and Holstrom's melodic bass set them apart from the majority. During these years, they contributed to a number of low-budget compilation albums for various local US independent labels but these were usually sold at live gigs and known copies are scarce to non-existent. In 1987 however, the band recorded an EP, Strangled/SceneZine, which was self-financed and 500 copies were released on their own eponymous record label. It was during this time that one of their gigs was attended by Kurt Cobain and years later prior to the release of Nevermind and during Nirvana's only ever appearance in Edinburgh, Cobain announced from the stage that he would give his guitar to anyone who knew how he could contact the band. Through a friend, a meeting was subsequently arranged and Fischer and Holstrom met with Cobain after the latter's gig in the city's Southern Bar.

Fischer and Holstrom's US stay came to a sudden end when they were refused re-entry to the States, after crossing over to Canada for a gig, and they chose to return to Scotland to consider their next move. This coincided with a raised interest in alternative rock in Britain and with Edinburgh bands The Hook And Pull Gang, Green Telescope and Goodbye Mr Mackenzie enjoying record company interest Mitschell agreed to relocate to Scotland to help push the band forward. Their live reputation followed them from America and with a strong three-track demo labels Warner Brothers, Virgin and Arista showed an interest in signing them, having been exposed to the independence and freedom of the Minneapolis scene, the band were reluctant to tie to a major label despite the financial stability it would have given them. Plans were then made to release their long overdue debut album on their own label and a distribution deal was signed with Pinnacle Entertainment (UK).

By November 1988, the band had finished recording twelve songs for the album at Signal Sounds in East Lothian, and were in the process of mixing these when a fire ripped through the main studio building one night, and all the master tapes together with much of the studio equipment was destroyed. At this time Axel Fischer, who had been suffering from worsening stomach pains for several years, was diagnosed with severe Crohn's disease and would be unable to tour for prolonged periods. This, coupled with the disappointment at the loss of their master tapes and ongoing financial struggles, led the band to announce an indefinite hiatus to activities, although they have never officially split up. Fischer and Holstrom remained in Edinburgh and Mitschell returned to the US, however it is believed that he emigrated back to the city in the 1990s.

In the early 2000s, the domain name www.snowcake.co.uk was registered by the members of the band, and a mailing list was advertised which quickly attracted fans with long memories from the UK and the US, and although updates have been sporadic, it has been reported that an email in late 2010 alerted list members to renewed activity from the band very soon.

References 

Scottish indie rock groups
Scottish alternative rock groups